Emir Kujović (Cyrillic: Емир Кујовић; born 22 June 1988) is Swedish professional footballer who plays as a striker. He has won five caps for the Sweden national team, and was a squad player at UEFA Euro 2016.

Club career

Halmstads BK
Kujović started his career in Superettan and Landskrona BoIS, in 2007 he joined Halmstads BK but was directly loaned out to Falkenbergs FF in Superettan for a year, in 2008 he returned to Halmstads BK and debuted in the first match of the season against Gefle IF (1-0) as a substitute.

While at Halmstads BK, he played with his older brother Ajsel Kujović, who represented the club between 2006 and 2009.

Kayserispor
Kujović was signed by Turkish club Kayserispor in October 2010 on a four-year deal starting in January 2011. On 5 January 2011, he scored his first goal for Kayserispor against Ankaragücü. In 2013, he also played, on loan, three games with the Elazığspor.

IFK Norrköping
On 9 August 2013, Kujović signed a 3.5-year contract with IFK Norrköping where he reunited with former Halmstads BK trainer Janne Andersson.

Djurgårdens IF
On 13 August 2019, he signed a 2.5-year contract with Djurgårdens IF.

International career
Kujović debuted for Sweden under-21 team 27 March 2009 against Belgium. He was called up to the senior Sweden squad to face Denmark for the UEFA Euro 2016 play-off in November 2015. Emir Kujovic was a squad player for Sweden at Euro 2016. He has earned a total of 5 caps, scoring 1 goal. His final international was a September 2016 FIFA World Cup qualification match against the Netherlands.

Personal life
Kujović is a practicing Muslim of Bosniak descent. He is the younger brother of Ajsel Kujović, who was a professional footballer.

Career statistics

International 

 Scores and results list Sweden's goal tally first, score column indicates score after each Kujovic goal.

Honours
IFK Norrköping
 Allsvenskan: 2015
Svenska Supercupen: 2015

Djurgårdens IF
Allsvenskan: 2019

Individual
Allsvenskan Top Scorer: 2015

References

External links
 
  
 

1988 births
Living people
People from Bijelo Polje
Swedish people of Montenegrin descent
Swedish people of Bosniak descent
Swedish Muslims
Association football forwards
Montenegrin footballers
Swedish footballers
Sweden under-21 international footballers
Sweden international footballers
UEFA Euro 2016 players
Landskrona BoIS players
Halmstads BK players
Falkenbergs FF players
Kayserispor footballers
Elazığspor footballers
IFK Norrköping players
K.A.A. Gent players
Fortuna Düsseldorf players
Fortuna Düsseldorf II players
Djurgårdens IF Fotboll players
Allsvenskan players
Süper Lig players
Belgian Pro League players
2. Bundesliga players
Regionalliga players
Swedish expatriate footballers
Expatriate footballers in Turkey
Swedish expatriate sportspeople in Turkey
Expatriate footballers in Belgium
Swedish expatriate sportspeople in Belgium
Expatriate footballers in Germany
Swedish expatriate sportspeople in Germany